George Francis Menard (born 1927) is a retired American ice hockey coach. He was the head coach of St. Lawrence during their renaissance after World War II taking them to five Frozen Fours during his tenure.

Career
As many people did during the second world war George Menard enlisted in the armed services after graduating high school, but as he enlisted in October 1945 his services were unneeded for the war effort. The following fall he began attending Brown University, playing both ice hockey and baseball for the Bears to such an outstanding degree that he was signed by the New York Yankees.

George eschewed a professional playing career in favor of coaching, becoming the head coach at St. Lawrence in 1955 for both ice hockey and baseball. Menard continued the Saint's winning ways from the beginning, getting his team to a second straight NCAA tournament in his first season. In each of his first nine seasons behind the bench Menard would get St. Lawrence to finish with winning records as well as making five tournament appearances (four coming in consecutive seasons). When St. Lawrence became a founding member of ECAC Hockey in 1961–62 Menard led the Saints to the inaugural conference tournament title and followed it up with the school's first 20-win season, a feat they wouldn't repeat for 20 years.

Menard took off the 1967–68 season to earn an MBA from Syracuse University and though he returned to Canton the next year he couldn't recover the success he had had his first dozen years as coach. Menard resigned after the 1970–71 season, turning the program over to Bernie McKinnon who had served as a stand-in during his year off and then resigned as the baseball head coach after the following season. After his retirement Menard was inducted into the Brown Athletic Hall of Fame in 1976 and the St. Lawrence Athletic Hall of Fame in 1981.

Head coaching record

Ice hockey

References

External links
 

1927 births
Living people
American ice hockey coaches
Brown Bears baseball players
Brown Bears men's ice hockey players
St. Lawrence Saints baseball coaches
St. Lawrence Saints men's ice hockey coaches
People from Burrillville, Rhode Island
Baseball players from Rhode Island
Ice hockey coaches from Rhode Island
American men's ice hockey defensemen